Events from the year 1855 in the United Kingdom.

Incumbents
 Monarch – Victoria
 Prime Minister – George Hamilton-Gordon, 4th Earl of Aberdeen (Coalition) (until 30 January); Henry John Temple, 3rd Viscount Palmerston (Whig) (starting 6 February)
 Parliament – 16th

Events
 9 January – the Earl of Aberdeen loses a vote of no confidence against his government over the management of the Crimean War.
 22 January – French political exile Emmanuel Barthélemy is hanged after being convicted of murdering a London man. Barthélemy had previously killed a fellow Frenchman in the last fatal duel in England, but has only been convicted of manslaughter on that occasion.
 29 January – Aberdeen resigns as Prime Minister.
 5 February – Viscount Palmerston becomes Prime Minister.
 28 February – Society of the Holy Cross (SSC) established as an association of Anglo-Catholic priests with a mission to the urban poor under the mastership of Charles Lowder.
 11 April – the first pillar boxes are installed in London, at the suggestion of Rowland Hill.
 18 April – The Bowring Treaty is signed between the UK and the kingdom of Siam, allowing foreigners to trade freely in Bangkok.
 15 May – Great Gold Robbery from a train between London Bridge and Folkestone.
 15 June – stamp duty is removed from newspapers creating mass market media in the UK.
 29 June – The Daily Telegraph newspaper begins publication in London.
 16 July – Australian colonies granted self-governing status.
 31 July – Limited Liability Act protects investors in the event of corporate collapse.
 3 September – last Bartholomew Fair in London.
 9 September – Siege of Sevastopol (1854–55) (Crimean War): Sevastopol falls to the British and their allies.
 17 October – Henry Bessemer files his patent for the Bessemer process for the production of steel.
 17 November – explorer David Livingstone discovers Victoria Falls in Africa.
 22 December – Metropolitan Board of Works established in London.

Undated
 James Clerk Maxwell unifies electricity and magnetism into a single theory, classical electromagnetism, thereby showing that light is an electromagnetic wave.
 The London School of Jewish Studies opens as the Jews' College, a rabbinical seminary, in London.
 Last minting of the fourpence coin (groat) for use in the U.K.
 The island of Samson, in the Isles of Scilly, is evacuated.

Publications
 Samuel Orchart Beeton's weekly The Boys' Own Magazine (begins publication January).
 Mrs Archer Clive's novel Paul Ferroll.
 Serialisation of Charles Dickens' novel Little Dorrit.
 Mrs Gaskell's novel North and South.
 Charles Kingsley's novel Westward Ho!
 William Makepeace Thackeray's novel The Newcomes.
 Anthony Trollope's novel The Warden.
 The Ancient Music of Ireland, including the first published version of the Londonderry Air.

Births
 21 January – Henry B. Jackson, admiral (died 1929).
 1 May – Marie Corelli, novelist (died 1924).
 23 May – Isabella Ford, socialist, feminist, trade unionist and writer (died 1924).
 2 June – Archibald Berkeley Milne, admiral (died 1938).
 28 August – Alexander Bethell, admiral (died 1932).
 17 December – Frank Hedges Butler, wine merchant and founding member of the Aero Club of Great Britain (died 1928).

Deaths
 3 January – Julius Hare, theological writer (born 1795).
 10 January – Mary Russell Mitford, novelist and dramatist (born 1787).
 25 January – Dorothy Wordsworth, poet and diarist (born 1771).
 20 February – Joseph Hume, doctor and politician (born 1777).
 27 February – Bryan Donkin, engineer and inventor (born 1768).
 3 March – Copley Fielding, watercolour landscape painter (born 1787).
 31 March – Charlotte Brontë, author (born 1816).
 13 April – Sir Henry De la Beche, geologist (born 1796).
 15 April – William John Bankes, MP, explorer and Egyptologist (born 1786; died in Venice).
 5 May – Sir Robert Inglis, 2nd Baronet, politician (born 1786).
 23 May – Charles Robert Malden, explorer (born 1797).
 28 June – Fitzroy Somerset, 1st Lord Raglan, commander of British forces in the Crimean War (born 1788).
 6 July – Andrew Crosse, 'gentleman scientist', pioneer experimenter in electricity and poet (born 1784).
 8 July – Sir Edward Parry, Arctic explorer (born 1790).
 30 August – Feargus O'Connor, political radical and Chartist leader (born 1794 in Ireland).
 4 September – Emma Tatham, poet (born 1829).
 18 September – James Finlay Weir Johnston, chemist (born 1796).
 27 September – John Adamson, antiquary and expert on Portuguese (born 1787)
 3 December – Robert Montgomery, poet (born 1807).
 18 December – Samuel Rogers, poet (born 1763).
 20 December – Thomas Cubitt, master builder (born 1785).

See also
 1855 in Scotland

References

 
Years of the 19th century in the United Kingdom